"This Time" is a rock ballad written by the Britpop band Starsailor, which brings back the captivating sound of the piano of their latest singles that propelled them to their earlier success.  This release followed a sell-out UK tour which culminated in a victorious show at London’s Brixton Academy.  This Time peaked at number 24 on the UK Singles Chart, and remains their last single to reach the Top 40 in the UK.

Music video 
 
The promotional music  video for 'This Time' is based on a concept of chaos theory commonly known as the butterfly effect. It was directed by ROJO (François Roland & Josef Baar). It shows a couple trying to find each other without success.  The protagonist is going to meet his girlfriend at a bus or train station. He enters a store and buys a teddy bear for his girlfriend. Two hours later he gets hit by a train while driving.  The video then appears to start again, two hours before, only this time he drops a coin at the store. This small event makes him a few seconds late over the first part of the music video which eventually saves him from the accident and gets him to realize that his girlfriend's letter says that they're going to meet  at the radio station, not the station.

Format details

CD
 This Time
 Push the Button (live Sugababes cover)

DVD
 This Time (video)
 In the Crossfire (Live from Brixton Academy) (video)
 This Time (Live from Nottingham Rock City) (audio)
 Believe Me (exclusive new track) (audio)

7" Coloured Vinyl
 This Time
 Believe Me (exclusive new track)

Charts

References 

2005 songs
2006 singles
Starsailor (band) songs
Songs written by James Walsh (musician)
Songs written by James Stelfox
Songs written by Barry Westhead
Songs written by Ben Byrne
EMI Records singles